Nonsan is a city in South Chungcheong Province, South Korea. The origin of Nonsan's geographical names is said to have come from the small garden " Nolmoe, " which rises in the middle of farming fields, where rice paddies and mountain are said to reflect geographical features. The city belongs to the Daejeon Metropolitan Area.

History
Nonsan has a significant history. During the Samhan period, Nonsan is believed to have been part of Mahan territory.  In the Baekje period, the district belonged to Hwangdeungyasan-gun.  The crucial battle in which Silla defeated Baekje is thought to have taken place in the general area of Nonsan.  Later, in the Silla period, Nonsan was divided into two different towns: Deogeun and Hwangsan.

The train station was built in 1911, in the same year as the rail line through the Nonsan plain was completed.

The modern city of Nonsan was established in 1914, by the merger of the four counties of Yeonsan-gun, Eunjin-gun, Noseong-gun and Seoksung-gun.

During the Korean War, a POW camp was set up by the U.S. and South Korean forces.  On June 18, 1953, at the Nonsan camp as well as at POW camps at Busan, 
Masan, and Kwangju, thousands of POWs swarmed out of the camps and melted into the local population in order to avoid being repatriated to North Korea.

Climate
Nonsan has a humid continental climate (Köppen: Dwa), but can be considered a borderline humid subtropical climate (Köppen: Cwa) using the  isotherm.

Transportation
Nonsan is served by the national railroad system and city, regional and national bus lines. An expressway connects the city to Daejeon and other cities. Many streets have bike paths, sharing pavement with sidewalks. The stream running through the city proper is not navigable, but downstream it joins the Geum River, and an outlying subdivision of the city serves as a significant fishing port.

Chungcheong Metropolitan Railroad is proposed, in the third phase, to set Ganggyeong Station for the starting point and connect the city with Gyeryong, Daejeon, and Cheongju.

Economics and industry
Nonsan is an agricultural city, with rice being the most important crop.  Other important crops include strawberries, ginseng, napa cabbage,
watermelons, and Korean pears.
According to The Chosun Ilbo, the farmers are growing new varieties of strawberry produced in Japan without the producer's permission, while the JoongAng Daily says "Strawberries grown in Nonsan are of various types: seolhyang, maehyang, geumhyang, janghi (akihime) and yukbo (red pearl). The first three were developed in Nonsan while the latter two are from Japan. Janghi is the most commonly grown in Korea. However, seolhyang is the sweetest". Sesil [pronounced "say -shill"] company is the world's third leading producer of insects for natural pest control.  The prominent yogurt company, Yakult, has its headquarters in Nonsan.  Agro-Fisheries Trade Corp. is a regional supplier of food products.

The greater Nonsan area includes the ROK Army training center.

Education

Higher education
 Konyang University, founded 1991, has its main campus in Nonsan.  It has a university hospital with educational programs for medical technicians, nurses and doctors in Daejeon
Geumgang University, founded 2004, is a Buddhist university in rural Nonsan, near Gyeryongsan.
Korea Bio Polytechnic is a two-year college run by the Department of Labor.
Korea National Defense University moved its campus from Seoul to Nonsan in 2017.

Secondary education
Nonsan has a number of high schools, including a girls' high school, a technical high school, and two private schools which attract students from across the province and beyond.

Tourism

Local attractions include the Eunjin Mireuk, a large standing Buddhist sculpture of the Goryeo period and its accompanying temple, Gwanchoksa, as well as the Baekje Military Museum.

Mireuk-bosal at Gwanchok Temple in Nonsan City, South Chungcheong Province, South Korea.

The spring Strawberry Festival  is a popular tourist event as is the Ganggyoung autumn fermented seafood festival.

The eight famous spots in Nonsan include Gwanchoksa, the historic sites of General Gyebaek, Tapjeong Reservoir, Ssanggyesa (Temple), and Noseong Sanseong (Fortress).

Other
The city has a concert hall, where various cultural activities such as concerts and lectures are held. Konyang University's auditorium also hosts free cultural activities for the community.

In June 2011, the multipurpose culture hall Sangsang Madang was completed.  It is dedicated to "indie art".

Donam Academy, one of the nine neo-Confucian seowon established in Korea during the Choseon dynasty, is in greater Nonsan.  It was made a UNESCO provisional world heritage site in December 2011.

Administrative divisions

Nonsan City has jurisdiction over 2 eup, 11 myeon, and 2 dong.

Twin towns – sister cities

Nonsan is twinned with:
 Seocho-gu, Seoul
 Gangdong-gu, Seoul
 Jung-gu, Daejeon
 Jecheon, Chungcheongbuk-do
 Yangpyeong, Gyeonggi-do
 Mungyeong, Gyeongsangbuk-do
 Jining, China
 Jinzhou, China
 Langfang, China
 Gotemba, Japan
 Habikino, Japan

Notable people
 Rhee In-je, three-time South Korean presidential candidate
 Chun Sung-gwan, Head of the Seoul Central District Prosecutor's Office (2009)
 Yeom Hong-chul, formal Mayor of Daejeon
Go Soo, film and television actor
Park Beom-shin, writer

See also
 List of cities in South Korea
 Geography of South Korea
 Nonsan station

References

External links
Official government website
 Government site for foreigners:  http://english.nonsan.go.kr/nsforeign/user.tdf?a=user.index.IndexApp&c=6002

 
Cities in South Chungcheong Province